Belloc Abbey, otherwise the Abbey of Notre-Dame de Belloc, is a Benedictine monastery located in Urt, in the Pyrénées-Atlantiques. It was founded in 1875.

Description 
The community, which comprises about 40 monks, follows the Rule of St. Benedict and belongs to the Subiaco Cassinese Congregation. The brothers offer the hospitality of their house to men, households and groups requiring silence or spiritual guidance.

To support themselves they principally make the ewes' milk cheese Abbaye de Belloc. Among other activities they also undertake illumination and calligraphy and run a bookshop open to the public.

Images

Notes and references

Bibliography 
 Marc Doucet (preface by Mgr. Dagens), 2009: Des hommes travaillés par Dieu: Histoire de l'Abbaye de Belloc, Paris, éditions du Cerf

External links 
 L'Abbaye de Belloc sur Abbayes en France

Benedictine monasteries in France
Buildings and structures in Pyrénées-Atlantiques